Mountain Soul II is the sixteenth studio album by American country music singer Patty Loveless. The album was released on September 29, 2009. It is a follow-up to her previous album, Mountain Soul, released in 2001. Four of the album's 15 songs, "Half Over You"; "Blue Memories"; "Feelings of Love"; and "A Handful of Dust", were previously recorded by Loveless on earlier albums. "Big Chance" was also previously included in the same form on 2005's Dreamin' My Dreams.

"Busted" was released as the album's lead-off single in September 2009. The album won the Grammy Award for Best Bluegrass Album at the 2011 Grammy Awards in Los Angeles.

Track listing 
 "Busted" (Harlan Howard) – 3:25
 "Fools Thin Air" (Guy Clark, Rodney Crowell) – 3:24 
 "A Handful of Dust" (Tony Arata) – 3:05
 "Half Over You" (Karen Staley) – 3:25
 "Prisoner's Tears" (Mike Henderson, Mark Irwin, Wally Wilson) – 3:56
 "Working on a Building" (traditional) – 2:52
 "Friends in Gloryland" (traditional) – 1:25
 "(We Are All) Children of Abraham" (Patty Loveless, Emory Gordy Jr.) – 2:24
 "Big Chance" (Loveless, Gordy) – 2:53
 "When the Last Curtain Falls" (Gordy, Jim Rushing) – 3:49
 "Blue Memories" (Karen Brooks, Paul Kennerley) – 2:47
 "You Burned the Bridge" (Jon Randall) – 4:19
 "Bramble and the Rose" (Barbara Keith) – 2:54
 "Feelings of Love" (Kostas) – 3:15
 "Diamond in My Crown" (Kennerley, Emmylou Harris) – 2:45

Personnel

 Mike Auldridge – dobro
 Barry Bales – upright bass
 Tom Britt – electric guitar
 Mike Bub – upright bass
 Jason Carter – fiddle
 Stuart Duncan – fiddle, mandolin
 Vince Gill – acoustic guitar, background vocals
 Emmylou Harris – background vocals
 Tim Hensley – background vocals
 Rebecca Lynn Howard – acoustic guitar, background vocals
 Rob Ickes – dobro
 Carl Jackson – banjo, background vocals
 Butch Lee – pump organ
 Patty Loveless – lead vocals, background vocals
 Del McCoury – acoustic guitar, background vocals
 Rob McCoury – banjo
 Ronnie McCoury – mandolin, mandola, background vocals
 Carmella Ramsey – background vocals
 Jon Randall – mandolin, background vocals
 Deanie Richardson – fiddle
 Kerlan Spur – percussion
 Bryan Sutton – banjo, acoustic guitar, mandolin
 Guthrie Trapp – electric guitar
 Rhonda Vincent – background vocals

Chart performance

References

External links 

2009 albums
Patty Loveless albums
Albums produced by Emory Gordy Jr.
Grammy Award for Best Bluegrass Album
Bluegrass albums